Bike crossing may refer to:

 Bicycle-sharing system, a service in which bicycles are made available for shared use to individuals who do not own them
 A road crossing for bikeways in their own rights-of-way

See also
 Crossing (disambiguation)
 Outline of cycling
 Road crossing (disambiguation)